Brent Lasater (born July 13, 1960) was a Republican member of the Missouri House of Representativesfrom 2010 to 2012. Lasater represents the 53rd District, encompassing part of Jackson County, Missouri. He was first elected to the Missouri House in November, 2010.

Personal life
Brent Lasater was born in Tipton, Indiana and raised in the Kansas City, Missouri area. After graduation from Blue Springs Christian School in 1978 he attended Joe Herndon Area Vocational-Technical School and Blue River Community College. Lasater still drives after 35 years as a professional truck driver. He and wife Veta have been married since 1980 and are the parents of one married son  and one married daughter, they have two grandsons named Tyler and Jaxon ages 12 and 6. When not engaged in his Representative duties Lasater resides in Independence, Missouri. In 2016 Lasater is seeking the State Senate district 11.

Politics
Brent Lasater was elected to the Missouri House of Representatives in 2010 on his third attempt. Lasater had made unsuccessful runs for the 53rd District seat in 2006 and 2008.
The seat was previously held by the term-limited Curt Dougherty. After defeating fellow Republican Anna Lynn Vogel in the August 2010 primary, Lasater was victorious over Democrat Diane Egger in the November general election. The contest was notable among Missouri politics for the large disparity in money spent by the two candidates. While Egger raised over $30,000 dollars, Lasater reported limited activity with the Missouri Ethics Commission, spending no more than $500. He is a member of the Missouri Farm Bureau, National Rifle Association, and Jackson County Republican Club.

Legislative assignment
Representative Lasater serves on the following committees:
 Appropriations - Public Safety and Corrections
 Crime Prevention and Public Safety
 Tourism and Natural Resources
 Transportation Funding and Public Institutions - Vice-Chairman
 Interim Committee on Passenger Rail
 Interim Committee on Criminal Justice

Electoral history

State Representative

State Senate

References

Republican Party members of the Missouri House of Representatives
People from Independence, Missouri
1960 births
Living people
People from Tipton, Indiana